Front Street Historic District may refer to:
(sorted by state, then city/town)

Front Street (River Park Drive) Historic District, Guttenberg, Iowa, listed on the National Register of Historic Places (NRHP) in Clayton County, Iowa
Front Street District, Greenup, Kentucky, listed on the NRHP in Greenup County, Kentucky
Front Street Historic District (Prestonsburg, Kentucky), listed on the NRHP in Floyd County, Kentucky
Front Street Historic District (Weymouth, Massachusetts), listed on the NRHP in Norfolk County, Massachusetts
North Front Street Commercial District, Mankato, Minnesota, listed on the NRHP in Blue Earth County, Minnesota
Front Street Historic District (Pascagoula, Mississippi), listed on the NRHP in Jackson County, Mississippi
Front Street Historic District (Exeter, New Hampshire), listed on the NRHP in Rockingham County, New Hampshire
Front Street-Parade Hill-Lower Warren Street Historic District, Hudson, NY, superseded on the NRHP by the Hudson Historic District
South Front Street Historic District, Philadelphia, PA, listed on the NRHP in Philadelphia, Pennsylvania